The Great India Place is a shopping mall in Noida, Uttar Pradesh, India. It is popularly known as GIP Mall. It is one of the largest malls in the country. The mall features a wide selection of national and international retail outlets. This grand shopping mall also shares its boundary with Worlds of Wonder, a major Amusement Park in the city. The Great India Place, Gardens Galleria Mall, Worlds of Wonder (WOW), Kidzania and Decathlon are all part of the larger Entertainment City Limited development on 150 acre land in the most expensive commercial hub of Noida in Delhi NCR.

Features
The Great India Place was developed by the Appughar Group the Unitech Group and is maintained by Entertainment City Ltd. It is located in Sector 38-A, Noida, adjacent to Noida Sector 18 metro station. The mall opens at 10 am every day for its visitors. The mall is itself part of the larger Entertainment City amusement park Worlds of Wonder.

The mall houses a variety of retail outlets, including Shopper's Stop, Globus, Pantaloons, Big Bazaar, Home Town, Woodland, Lifestyle and Lifestyle Home, along with international brands like Adidas, Nike, Guess, Marks & Spencer. The mall is divided into specific zones, with home and grocery on the basement level, women's apparel on one side, men's on the other and a  food and entertainment zone on the top floor. Its six-screen BIG Cinemas multiplex has a total seating capacity of 1220. There is also an  zone dedicated to a Wedding Bazaar, and a Home Saaz section for home improvement. A large chunk of the mall's total area is covered by Future Group ventures, including Home Town, Big Bazaar and Pantaloon.

References

External links
 Unitech Group
 Sahara Mall on shoppingmalls.in

Noida
Shopping malls in Uttar Pradesh
Economy of Noida
Shopping malls established in 2007
2007 establishments in Uttar Pradesh
Buildings and structures in Noida